"Woodchopper's Ball", also known as "At the Woodchopper's Ball" is a 1939 jazz composition by Joe Bishop and Woody Herman. The up-tempo blues tune in D-flat major was the Woody Herman Orchestra's biggest hit, as well as the most popular composition of either composer, selling a million records.

The tune has been performed by numerous artists and is considered a jazz standard. It is included in the first volume of Hal Leonard's Real Book. The song was covered by the British blues/rock band Ten Years After on their album, Undead. The original recording by Woody Herman and His Orchestra received the Grammy Hall of Fame Award in 2002.

"Twistin' at the Woodchopper's Ball" written by Ronn Metcalfe was a 1962 hit based on Herman's song, which attained a gold album status.

See also
List of 1930s jazz standards

References

Songs about parties
1939 songs
1939 singles
Instrumentals
Jazz compositions
1930s jazz standards
Grammy Hall of Fame Award recipients
Songs with music by Woody Herman
Ten Years After songs